Imokilly is one of the baronies of Ireland, an historical geographical unit of land. Its chief town is Youghal. It is one of 24 baronies in the county of Cork. Other neighbouring baronies include Barrymore to the west (whose chief town is Midleton) and Kinnatalloon to the north (whose chief town is Conna).

The barony includes most of the peninsula or land ranging from Mount Uniacke in the valley of the River Bride (in the north), to the estuary of the Munster Blackwater (in the east), to Ballycotton Bay (in the south) to Cork Harbour in the west. The main settlements are Youghal, Killeagh, Castlemartyr, Ballycotton, Shanagarry, Mogeely and Cloyne.

Legal context

Baronies were created after the Norman invasion of Ireland as divisions of counties and were used in the administration of justice and the raising of revenue. While baronies continue to be officially defined units, they have been administratively obsolete since 1898. However, they continue to be used in land registration and in specification, such as in planning permissions. In many cases, a barony corresponds to an earlier Gaelic túath which had submitted to the Crown.

History
Both Imokilly and the adjacent barony of Barrymore formed the early medieval kingdom of the Uí Liatháin which was awarded to the Cambro-Norman De Barry family by King John of England in 1206. Its name derives from the Gaelic name of the most powerful septs in the ancient kingdom - the Uí Meic Caille  and the Uí Thassaig.

In 1420, James FitzGerald, 6th Earl of Desmond was made Seneschal of the barony. The Earls of Desmond continued to appoint their FitzGerald cousins to the office. As a result of their participation on the losing side of the Desmond Rebellions, their lands and offices were forfeit to the Crown.

Subsequently, Baron Ponsonby of Imokilly was a title in the Peerage of the United Kingdom.

Civil parishes 
There are 26 civil parishes in the barony.

Imokilly today 
Economic activity in the barony is dominated by agriculture. The cheese Imokilly Regato (PDO) has been granted Protected Geographical Status under European Union law. Trabolgan Holiday Village is located in the civil parish of Trabolgan.

Imokilly GAA is the region's Gaelic football and Hurling division. Imokilly won the Cork SHC in 2017, beating Blackrock by 3-13 to 0-18.

See also 
 List of civil parishes of County Cork
 List of townlands of the barony of Imokilly

References
From :

From other sources:

External links
 
Mogeely village website

Baronies of County Cork